François Ludo (4 March 1930 – 29 June 1992) was a French football player.

Personal life
Ludo was born in France and was of Polish descent. He was the uncle of the French footballer, and RC Lens legend Éric Sikora.

References

External links
 
 
Profile at French federation official site 
Profile and stats

1930 births
1992 deaths
Footballers from Hauts-de-France
French footballers
France international footballers
French people of Polish descent
RC Lens players
AS Monaco FC players
Grenoble Foot 38 players
Ligue 1 players
Association football defenders
Sportspeople from Pas-de-Calais